Pascula ozenneana is a species of sea snail, a marine gastropod mollusk in the family Muricidae, the murex snails or rock snails.

Description
The length of the shell attains 14 mm.

Distribution

References

 Crosse, H., 1861. Diagnoses d'espèces nouvelles. Journal de Conchyliologie 9: 285
 Crosse, H., 1862. Diagnoses d'espèces nouvelles. Journal de Conchyliologie 10: 47-51
 Fischer-Piette, E., 1950. - Listes des types décrits dans le Journal de Conchyliologie et conservés dans la collection de ce journal. Journal de Conchyliologie 90: 8-23

Pascula
Gastropods described in 1861